Chamberlin is an electro-mechanical musical keyboard instrument.

Chamberlin may also refer to:
 Chamberlin (surname)
 The Chamberlin, a retirement community and historic hotel in Hampton, Virginia, formerly known as the Chamberlin Hotel
 Chamberlin (band), American folk rock band
 Chamberlin (lunar crater)
 Chamberlin (Martian crater)
 Chamberlin Observatory
 Chamberlin trimetric projection
 Chamberlin-Johnson-DuBose Company
 Chamberlin Springs, United States

See also 
 Chamberlain (disambiguation)
 Chamberlayne (disambiguation)